Achille Fred "Chick" Maggioli (May 17, 1922 – December 20, 2012) was an American football defensive back and halfback in the National Football League (NFL) for the Detroit Lions and the Baltimore Colts. He also played in the All-America Football Conference (AAFC) for the Buffalo Bills.

Born in Mishawaka, Indiana, Maggioli was an all-state football player at Mishawaka High School, graduating in 1941. He then attended and played college football at Indiana University in 1942. He joined the Marine Corps Officer Training Program in 1943, which transferred him to the University of Notre Dame, where he played football in 1943 and 1944.  At Notre Dame, he was the reserve halfback on coach Frank Leahy's national champion 1943 Notre Dame Fighting Irish football team and a starting halfback in 1944. Called to active duty before the end of the 1944 season, he served in the Marine Corps and was awarded the Purple Heart at the Battle of Okinawa. Returning from World War II, Maggioli played halfback on the 1946 Illinois Fighting Illini football team, which won the Big Ten Conference and the 1947 Rose Bowl, graduating from the University of Illinois Urbana-Champaign that May.

Maggioli was drafted in the 11th round of the 1946 NFL Draft by the Washington Redskins and ultimately played for the Buffalo Bills as a two-way player in 1948, his team winning the Eastern Division of the AAFL. He played defensive back for the Detroit Lions in 1949 and with the Baltimore Colts in 1950, intercepting eight passes in the final year of his pro football career.

He is a member of both the Indiana Football Hall of Fame and Mishawaka High School Athletic Hall of Fame.

References

External links
 

1922 births
2012 deaths
American football defensive backs
American football halfbacks
Baltimore Colts (1947–1950) players
Buffalo Bills (AAFC) players
Detroit Lions players
Illinois Fighting Illini football players
Notre Dame Fighting Irish football players
United States Marine Corps personnel of World War II
United States Marines
People from Mishawaka, Indiana
Players of American football from Indiana